Q School 2021 – Event 1 was the first of three qualifying tournaments for the 2021–22 snooker season. It took place from 27 May to 1 June 2021 at the Ponds Forge International Sports Centre in Sheffield, England.

Format 
The draw was made on 18 May 2021, with players seeded for the first time in the tournament's history. The seeded players were those that dropped off the tour at the end of the 2020–21 season, or those who ranked highly in 2020 Q School. The event was played in a knockout system with the winner of each section earning a two-year tour card to play on the main tour for the 2021–22 and 2022–23 seasons. All matches were the best-of-seven frames.

Main draw

Section 1 
Round 1

Section 2 
Round 1

Section 3 
Round 1

Section 4 
Round 1

Century breaks 
Total: 25

139  Si Jiahui
135, 104  Michael Georgiou
134, 100  Hammad Miah
132  Ross Muir
130  Joshua Cooper
129  Rod Lawler
127, 103  Michael White
119, 102  Peter Lines
118  Bai Langning
116  Soheil Vahedi
114  Luke Simmonds
111  Riley Parsons
110  Raymond Fry
108  Sydney Wilson
107  Kishan Hirani
107  Yu Kiu Chang
106, 103  Mitchell Mann
105  Alex Clenshaw
104  Dylan Mitchell
103  Alex Taubman

References

Snooker competitions in England
Q School (snooker)
2021 in snooker